Yatsevich is a surname. Notable people with the surname include:

Aleksandr Yatsevich (born 1956), Russian hurdler
Kirill Yatsevich (born 1992), Russian track cyclist
Nastassia Yatsevich (born 1985), Belarusian race walker

See also
 Aleksandrs Jackevičs (born 1958), Latvian judoka